Sharyland High School is a high school in Mission, Texas, United States. The school, which is classified as "5A" by the UIL, is a part of the Sharyland Independent School District.

The school primarily serves Sharyland, an unincorporated rural area known for its agricultural and citrus industry. The school also serves portions of the cities of Alton,  McAllen, Mission, Edinburg, and Palmhurst.

Notable alumni
Tres Barrera - MLB player
Lloyd Bentsen -  politician, lawyer, businessman, Ret. Air Force Colonel
Jorge Cantu -  former Major League Baseball (MLB) player 
Jaime García -  former MLB player
Abraham Ancer - Mexican Professional Golfer In The PGA Tour And PGA European Tour
Ben Ward

References

External links
 

Mission, Texas
Sharyland Independent School District high schools